Denticula elegans is a species of diatoms in the family Bacillariaceae.

References

 Denticula elegans at WoRMS

Bacillariales
Species described in 1844
Taxa named by Friedrich Traugott Kützing